Data classification may refer to:

 Data classification (data management)
 Data classification (business intelligence)
 Classification (machine learning), classification of data using machine learning algorithms
 Assigning a level of sensitivity to classified information
 In computer science, the data type of a piece of data

See also
 Classification (disambiguation)
 Categorization